is a Japanese bonsai artist, born in Ōmiya-ku, Saitama on March 31, 1940.

Career
When Kimura was 11, his father died. Kimura wanted to be a rock and roll musician as a teenager, but at age 15, following the wishes of his mother, he started an apprenticeship at Toju-en Bonsai Garden, under master Motosuke Hamano. His apprenticeship lasted eleven years.

Nowadays, Kimura is regarded as a genius and innovator in the bonsai world. He specializes in shimpaku junipers. His trees are known for their intricate deadwood features and their harsh, stark features; this modern style is very demanding on trees, which must be dramatically bent and twisted. Within the bonsai community, he has become known as the "Magical Technician of Kindai Shuppan".

Kimura has done presentations and demonstrations around the world, and his work has appeared in numerous bonsai publications. He won the Prime Minister's Award for the years 1988, 1995, 2000, and 2001, and the Minister of Education Award in 1999. His past apprentices include Marco Invernizzi, Salvatore Liporace, Ernie Kuo, Marc Noelanders, Kawabe Takeo, and Ryan Neil.

Published works
Katsuhito Onishi edited the Japanese texts The Magical Technician of Kindai Shuppan in 1982, Part II in 1984, and Part III in 1989. The English version, made up of Part II with some of Part I, was published as The Bonsai Art of Kimura by Stone Lantern Publishing Co. in 1992. The Magician: the Bonsai Art of Kimura 2 was released in 2007 by Stone Lantern. A Spanish translation, Masahiko Kimura: el técnico mágico del bonsai actual was published in 1988 by Ediciones Tyris, S.A., His 9-video 4-hour "Kimura Master Class" course was made available by Bonsai Empire in 2020.

References

External links
 "Masahiko Kimura 2005 Photos"
 "Shimpaku no Ishizuki: 'Stone-Affixed' Juniper" by Masahiko Kimura
 "Masahiko Kimura Demonstration, MABA 2000 Detroit Convention" by Paul Baresi
 “Bonsai, Art and Kimura” by Gunter Lind
 ASPAC KIMURA DEMO 2011 video Uploaded February 23, 2012
 8th WBFF KIMURA DEMO 2017 video Uploaded April 27, 2017
 Kimura’s home Bonsai channel
 Kimura's Online Masterclass

Living people
1940 births
Bonsai artists
Artists from Saitama Prefecture